= Old pumping station =

Coordinates: 53°04′48″N 8°53′21″E

Altes Pumpwerk
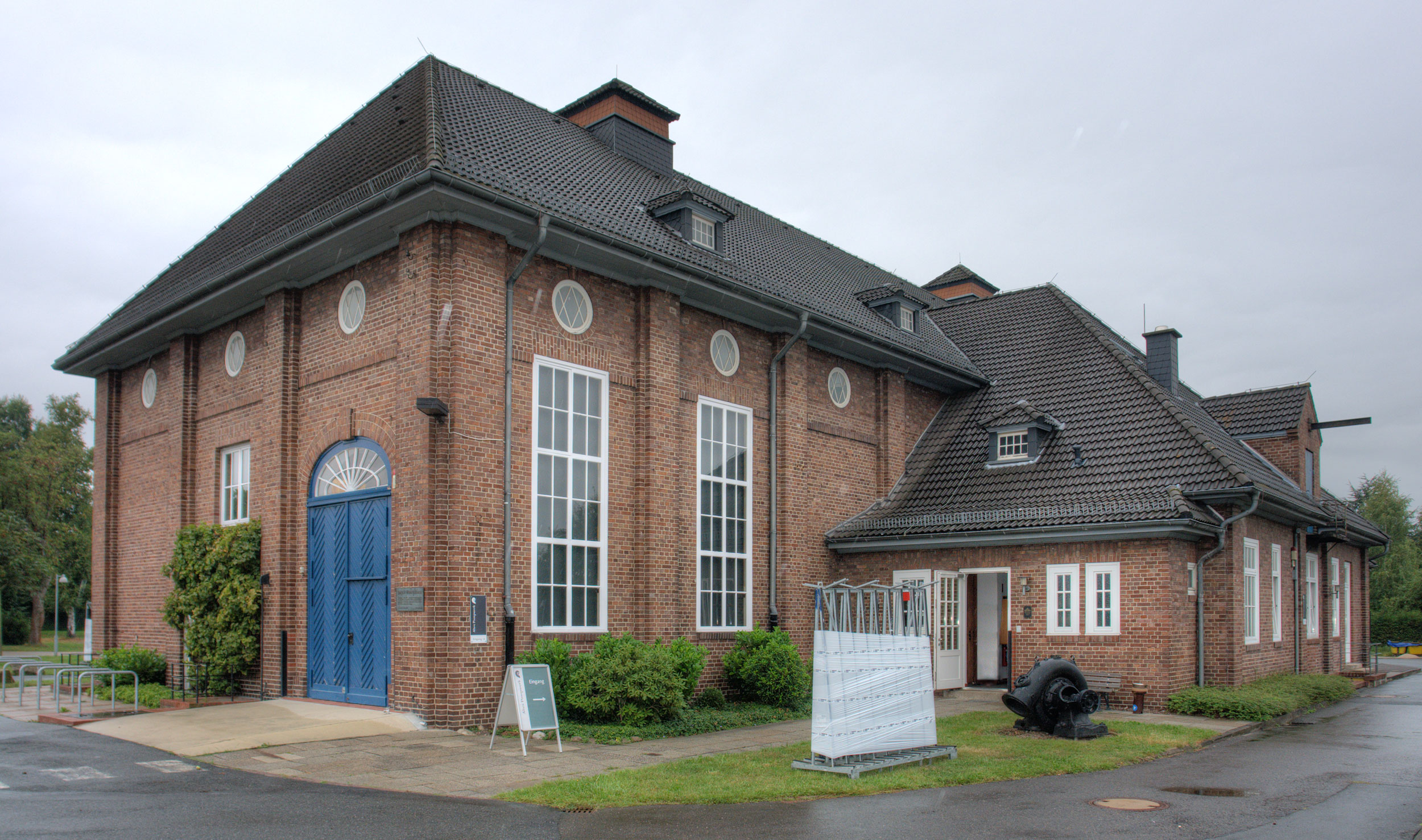
- The museum in 2013
- Established: 1913
- Location: Bremen
- Website: www.hansewasser.de

The Altes Pumpwerk or Old pumping station is located in Bremen in Germany. The disused sewage pumping station is now used as a museum showing the history of water treatment.

== History ==
Historically the people of Bremen would tip their waste from their toilet windows into the river and this caused disease.

The building was in use from 1913 to 1994 pumping sewage into the River Weser. Initially the effluent was pumped into the river after very little treatment but later the waste products were cleaned first at a sewage treatment plant at Seahausen. A new pumping station was started in 1994 and this station was surplus to requirements. The museum was started by a group of volunteers including former employees in 1997. The museum won an award in 2010.

== Description ==
The museum has many displays. It also has an entrance to the underground systems for water treatment.
